Air Marshal Inamul Haque Khan  (25 May 1927 – 10 August 2017) was a three-star air officer in the Pakistan Air Force who is known for his role as AOC of the Dacca airbase of the Pakistan Air Force.

In 1971, Inamul Haque Khan, as Air Commodore, was one of the highest-ranking officers to be taken as a prisoner of war by India after Eastern Command's Commander Lieutenant-General A.A.K. Niazi signed an instrument of surrender with Indian Army's Eastern Command GOC-in-C, Lieutenant-General Jagjit Singh Aurora.

After his repatriation in 1974, he continued to serve in the Air Force with distinction, and eventually joined President General Zia-ul-Haq's administration where he held many cabinet ministries.

Biography

Inamul Haque Khan was born in Delhi in India, into an Urdu-speaking family on 23 May 1927. He was educated at the Aligarh Muslim University where he attained his BA and MA in English literature and briefly tenured as professor of English at the Zakir Husain Delhi College from 1945–47.

In 1948, he emigrated to Pakistan, following the partition of India and joined the Pakistan Air Force after seeing an advertisement. Inamul was directed to attend the RPAF College at Risalpur. He graduated in the class of 5th GD pilot course.

He participated well in the Indo-Pakistani air war during the second war with India in 1965 as Group-Captain, earning recognition as an ace fighter. He continued his lectures on English literature, serving in the faculty at the Islamia College.

In 1969, he was promoted to one star rank, Air Commodore, in the Pakistan Air Force and was stationed in East Pakistan. In June 1971, he took over as the air officer commanding Dacca airbase from Air Commodore M.Z  Masud. As the war progressed, Air Cdre. Haque was instrumental in getting almost all PAF pilots and their aircraft out of Dacca after the Dhaka Airport was permanently damaged by the Indian Air Force, and had all the air force pilots flown out to Burma. Though it was initially thought that the army aviation's evacuation by air was not possible due to the  air superiority enjoyed by the IAF, he also provided his expertise to army aviation pilots to fly out the army helicopters with remaining PAF pilots. He himself, however, stuck to his post till the end of the war and then was taken as a prisoner of war by the Indian Army in 1971.

In 1974, Inamul Haque was repatriated to Pakistan under the agreement signed with India and Bangladesh, and was allowed to continue his service, eventually attaining the three-star rank in the Air Force. Air Vice Marshal Haq had been appointed as the ACAS (Operations) at the Air AHQ, and later commanded Air Defence Command as its AOC-in-C with a three-star rank, Air Marshal. His command assignment also included as Director General Joint Staff at JS HQ.

Air Mshl Haque was appointed as Interior Minister in the Zia administration until 5 July 1978. From 1978-82, he served as the Minister of Housing and Works. In 1980-81, he also led the Ministry of Water and Power. In 1981, he was posted on a diplomatic assignment as an envoy to Croatia until 1985.

From 1997–99, he remained part of the cabinet of Prime Minister Nawaz Sharif but eventually retired. Air Marshal Inamul Haque died of natural causes on the 10 August 2017 at the age of 90 after being ill for quite some time. His funeral prayers were held at PAF Base Noor Khan on 11 August with full military honours.

Awards and decorations

References

External links

1927 births
2017 deaths
People from Delhi
Aligarh Muslim University alumni
Academic staff of Delhi University
Muhajir people
Academic staff of Islamia College University
Pakistan Air Force officers
Pakistan Air Force air marshals
Pakistani flying aces
People of the Bangladesh Liberation War
Pakistani prisoners of war
Military government of Pakistan (1977–1988)
Pakistani poets
Pakistani non-fiction writers
Pakistan Muslim League (N) politicians
Pakistani novelists
Pakistani memoirists
Ambassadors of Pakistan to Croatia
Information Ministers of Pakistan
Water and Power Ministers of Pakistan
English-language writers from Pakistan
Indian emigrants to Pakistan